Haim Ernst Wertheimer (August 24, 1893 – March 23, 1978) was an Israeli biochemist.

Biography 
Wertheimer was born in Bühl, Germany in 1893 and studied in his native town and in Baden-Baden. He commenced studying medicine in 1912, initially in Berlin, Bonn and Kiel, before his studies were interrupted by World War I, where he served in a medical capacity in Flanders and Italy, and was awarded the Iron Cross, second class, and other decorations.  Following the war, he completed his medical studies in Heidelberg University.

In 1920–21 Wertheimer worked as a doctor at Berlin's municipal orphanage, and subsequently received a position at the Institute for Physiology, University of Halle.

With the Nazi rise to power in Germany Wertheimer lost his job. In 1934 he emigrated to Mandate Palestine and accepted a job as temporary director of the Laboratory of Chemistry, at  Hadassah Medical School in the Hebrew University of Jerusalem. He continued working at the Hadassah Medical Center until 1963, and served as dean of the institution in the '50s. Werthimer is regarded as the father of the field of fat metabolism.

Awards 
 In 1956, Wertheimer was awarded the Israel Prize, for medicine.
 In 1964, he received the Solomon Bublick Award of the Hebrew University of Jerusalem.

See also 
List of Israel Prize recipients
Wertheimer

References

External links 
 Curriculum Vitai in German

Heidelberg University alumni
Academic staff of the University of Halle
Academic staff of the Hebrew University of Jerusalem
Israel Prize in medicine recipients
Israeli scientists
Jewish emigrants from Nazi Germany to Mandatory Palestine
German Jewish military personnel of World War I
People from Bühl (Baden)
1893 births
1978 deaths
Solomon Bublick Award recipients
Physicians from Baden-Württemberg